Kachi A. Ozumba is a Nigerian-born novelist and short story writer. He won the Arts Council England's Decibel Penguin Prize in 2006 and the Commonwealth Short Story Prize (Africa region) in 2009. His debut novel, The Shadow of a Smile (2009), was shortlisted for the Royal Society of Literature Ondaatje Prize for a distinguished work of fiction, non-fiction or poetry, evoking the spirit of a place and longlisted for the 2010 Desmond Elliott Prize.

Ozumba studied at the University of Ibadan, University of Leeds, and Newcastle University.

References

External links
Kachi A. Ozumba's website.
Nigerian wins Commonwealth regional literary award

21st-century Nigerian novelists
Living people
21st-century male writers
Nigerian male novelists
Year of birth missing (living people)